Oslaria is a genus of moths of the family Noctuidae. the genus was erected by Harrison Gray Dyar Jr. in 1904.

Species
Oslaria viridifera (Grote, [1883]) Arizona
Oslaria pura Barnes & McDunnough, 1911 Arizona
Oslaria viridescens (Schaus, 1904) Mexico

References

Hadeninae